South of the Clouds may refer to:

 South of the Clouds (1950 film), a documentary by William James
 South of the Clouds (2004 film) or 云的南方, a Chinese film by Zhu Wen
 South of the Clouds (2014 film) or 北回归线, a Chinese film by Guo Shuang and Feng Yuan
 South of the Clouds (novel), a 2018 novel by John D. Kuhns

See also
Yunnan, literally "South of the Clouds", a Chinese province